Stamatia Scarvelis (born 17 August 1995) is an American-born Greek athlete. She competed in the semi-final of the hammer throw event at the 2019 World Athletics Championships in Doha, taking the 17th place. 

Her personal best (71.43 m) ranks her second among all-time Greek female hammer throwers.

She is the younger sister of the shot putter Nicholas Scarvelis.

Competition record

References

1995 births
Living people
Greek female athletes
Greek female hammer throwers
Place of birth missing (living people)
Tennessee Volunteers women's track and field athletes
Athletes (track and field) at the 2020 Summer Olympics
Olympic athletes of Greece
20th-century Greek women
21st-century Greek women
Sportspeople from Santa Barbara, California